Downdetector is an online platform that provides users with real-time information about the status of various websites and services.

The information that is provided by the site is based upon user outage reports, which are collected from various sources, including the comment section of each website's page on Downdetector and Twitter. A map is also shown with the locations of the outage reports, and a list of cities with the corresponding number of reports is shown above the map. Downdetector is available in 45 countries, with a different site for each country.

Downdetector was founded in April 2012 by Tom Sanders and Sander van de Graaf. Downdetector was acquired by Ookla, the company behind Speedtest.net, in August 2018.

References 

Websites
Internet properties established in 2012
2018 mergers and acquisitions